Kumar Barilya is a village in Baruakhali Union, Nawabganj Upazila, Dhaka District, Dhaka Division in Bangladesh.

References

Populated places in Dhaka Division